Pete Laverick (born 18 January 1995) is a former professional rugby union player from Bath, England.

Career
Laverick joined Exeter Chiefs after studying at Exeter University. In August 2017 he joined the Cornish Pirates on loan. In January 2018 he was named in the Chiefs side to face Worcester Warriors in the Anglo-Welsh Cup. In 2020, he joined Valley RFC in Hong Kong after taking up a position as a trainee banker with Société Générale.

Personal life
Born in Bath, Somerset Laverick was educated at  Prior Park College before attending Exeter University with whom Exeter Chiefs have strong links.

References

Living people
1995 births
Rugby union centres
Alumni of the University of Exeter
Valley RFC players
Cornish Pirates players
People educated at Prior Park College
English rugby union players
Exeter Chiefs players
English expatriate rugby union players
English expatriate sportspeople in Hong Kong
Expatriate rugby union players in Hong Kong